Augusto Duarte Ribeiro (Campinas, February 28, 1917 – São Paulo, August 16, 1969), better known as pseudonym Denis Brean, was a Brazilian composer, journalist, broadcaster and lyricist.

Biography
Born in 1917, in the Brazilian state of São Paulo, in Campinas, Brean was considered one of the best composers of his state. Successful compositions that would become classics include: as his first major hit, "Boogie-Woogie na Favela", recorded in 1945 by Ciro Monteiro, and recorded later by other artists such as Zacarias and his Orquestra; Roberto Silva; and Anjos do Inferno. His first work was "Poesia da Uva", which won a local award and was quickly recorded by Ciro Monteiro. Brean also had success as a composer of Carnaval marches, such as "Grande Caruso", recorded João Dias in 1952. Brean also composed two classics, "Conselho" and "Franqueza", recorded by Nora Ney and Maysa, and later re-recorded by various other artists.

He retired from his artistic career in 1960.

References

People from Campinas
Brazilian composers
Brazilian journalists
Male journalists
Brazilian radio personalities
Brazilian lyricists
Samba musicians
Música Popular Brasileira musicians
1917 births
1969 deaths
20th-century journalists